Maumanorig or Kilcolman is the site of the remains of a medieval Christian monastery and National Monument located on the Dingle Peninsula, County Kerry, Ireland.

Location

The placename is Irish for "hill-top of the yellow stones" or "mountain pass of the Hoares." It may have been a starting-point for pilgrims to Skellig Michael or Mount Brandon.

Description
Maumanorig is a circular enclosure within which are a church site, two hut-sites and several gravemarkers.

There is a cross pattee-inscribed ogham stone, 115 cm (3 ft 9 in) tall and 158 metres (5 feet) long. The west face bears the Ogham inscription and two crosses. The Ogham (CIIC 193) reads ᚛ᚐᚅᚋ ᚉᚑᚂᚋᚐᚅ ᚐᚔᚂᚔᚈᚆᚔᚏ᚜ ANM COL(OLṬḤ)ṂẠṆ ẠḶỊṬḤIR meaning "[written in] the name of Colmán, the pilgrim."

It may commemorate Colmán Oilither, grandson of Díarmait mac Fergosa Cerrbéoil, who died c. AD 565–572.

Also there is a small cross-inscribed stone, a holed stone and three bullaun stones.

References

Christian monasteries in the Republic of Ireland
Religion in County Kerry
Archaeological sites in County Kerry
National Monuments in County Kerry